The Lockheed Constellation was an American civil airliner and military transport built in the 1940s and 1950s; this is a list of its variants.

Commercial transport

Civilian / Company designations
L-049
The L-049 was the original commercial airliner produced, although some earlier L-049s were begun as military transports and completed as airliners. L-649 aircraft followed, with more powerful engines, but all were soon upgraded to L-749 standard with long-range fuel tanks.  88 L-049, 14 L-649, and 131 L-749 were built, including conversions from earlier models and military versions. First 22 aircraft delivered as C-69 transports, first flight 9 January 1943
L-149
L-049 conversion to include extra wing fuel tanks for a longer range. Production versions were planned for Pan Am, but none were ever produced.
L-249
Company designation for the XB-30 bomber. Project cancelled in favor of the Boeing B-29.
L-349
Company designation for the C-69B. None built.
L-449
Unknown proposed civilian airliner version.
L-549
Company designation for the C-69C. One built.
L-649
R-3350-749C18BD engines with 2,500 hp (1,865 kW) each, seating for up to 81, first flight 19 October 1946
L-649A
Reinforced landing gear and fuselage
L-749
6,145 US gal (23,640 L) of fuel providing the capability for non-stop transatlantic flights, first flight 14 March 1947
L-749A
Reinforced landing gear and fuselage
L-749B
Turbine powered. Project cancelled due to the absence of a suitable powerplant.
L-849
Planned version of the L-749, which would have had Wright R-3350 TurboCompounds.
L-949
Proposed Speedfreighter combi version of the L-849 with an 18 ft 4in fuselage stretch.
L-1049
First production version, 24 built. An 18 ft 4 in (5.59 m) stretched version with a maximum capacity of 109 passengers, square windows; all 1049C and later models had Turbo-Compound engines. Some later models had optional tip tanks. First flight 14 July 1951.  579 built, including military versions.
L-1049A
Company designation for the WV-2, WV-3, EC-121D and RC-121D.
L-1049B
Company designation for the R7V-1, RC-121C and VC-121E.
L-1049C
Civil variant of the 1049B for 110 passengers with four R-3350-87ТС18DA-1 Turbo-compound engines with 3,250 hp (2,425 kW) each, 48 built
L-1049D
Freight version of L-1049B with wing and fuselage modifications and a large cargo door, four built
L-1049E
Passenger variant of the 1049D, 28 built
L-1049F
Company designation for the C-121C.
L-1049G
Advanced variant with four R-3350-972ТС18DA-3 engines with higher METO power, ability to carry wingtip fuel tanks, 102 built
L-1049H
Passenger/freight convertible version of L-1049G with large cargo door, 53 built
L-1049J
Planned L-1049G with the wings of the R7V-2.
L-1149
A planned Allison turboprop version of the L-1049G and L-1049H.
L-1249A
Company designation for the R7V-2 and YC-121F.
L-1249B
Planned turboprop passenger version of the R7V-2/YC-121F.

L-1349 unidentified. Dominique Breffort's book claims no design with the L-1349 designation ever existed, possibly due to superstitious belief reasons.

L-1449
Proposed turboprop version of the L-1049G with a stretched fuselage and new wing.
L-1549
Planned stretched version of the L-1449.

L-1649A Starliner
Production version, R-3350-988TC18EA-2 Turbo Cyclone engines with 3,400 hp (2,536 kW) each. Long-range passenger aircraft designed to compete with Douglas DC-7C. The standard radome for the weather radar extends total length by 2 ft 7 in (0.78 m) over L-1049 without radome. New thin-section wing with a straight taper, and much larger fuel capacity giving a ferry range of over 6,880 mi (11,080 km), first flight 10 October 1956. 44, including the prototype, were built.
L-1649B
Planned turboprop version of the L-1649A.
L-051
Original company designation for the XB-30 project.
L-084
The XW2V-1 was a planned radar version of the WV-2 with the Starliner's wings for the US Navy. It would have included four Allison T56-A8 engines and missiles for protection against attackers. Considerably different from its predecessors, given the production designation Lockheed L-084.

Military designations

XB-30
Bomber version of the C-69. Was given model designation L-051 and later L-249.
XC-69
Designation for the prototype Constellation. One built. The C-69 was the original military transport version for the USAAF. All aircraft built during World War II were pressed into military service under this designation.
C-69
Original troop transport version. Almost all of this type were converted into L-049 airliners. 22 were built.
C-69A
Proposed long range troop version of the C-69.
C-69B
Proposed long range troop version of the C-69 designed to carry B-29 Superfortress engines to China. Was given model designation L-349.
C-69C-1
VIP transport aircraft, later designated ZC-69C-1. Only one aircraft was produced. Was given model designation L-549.
C-69D
Proposed VIP transport version.
XC-69E
Prototype XC-69 converted into an engine testbed. It was powered by 4 Pratt & Whitney R-2800 Double Wasp engines.

C-121A
The C-121 was the military transport version of improved L-749 introduced in 1948. Reinforced floor, cargo door in port rear fuselage
VC-121A
VIP transport aircraft, converted from the C-121A
VC-121B
VIP transport for use by the President of the United States of America
C-121C
R7V-1 with R-3350-34 engines with 3,400 hp (2,536 kW) each, based on L-1049
JC-121C
Two C-121C and one TC-121C used as avionics testbeds
NC-121C
One C-121C converted for permanent use as a testbed
RC-121C
USAF long-range airborne radar analogous to Navy's WV-2
TC-121C
Nine RC-121Cs Converted as AEW trainers, subsequently became EC-121C
VC-121C
VIP version of C-121C. Total 4.
EC-121D
Big Eye/College Eye/Disco early warning variant,  originally designated RC-121D
NC-121D
WV-2 converted to observe high speed objects in the atmosphere nicknamed the "Tripple Nipple"
RC-121D
WV-2 with wingtip fuel tanks, later redesignated EC-121D
VC-121E
VIP transport for use by the President of the United States of America
YC-121F
Two prototype R7V-1 with Pratt & Whitney T34-P-6 turboprops with 6,000 shp (4,476 kW) each
C-121G
32 Navy R7V-1 delivered to USAF
TC-121G
Designation given to 9 C-121G converted into trainers
VC-121G
One C-121G given the role as a temporary VIP Transport
EC-121H
42 EC-121D with upgraded electronics
C-121J
Redesignated Navy R7V-1
EC-121J
2 EC-121D with upgraded electronics
NC-121J
7 C-121J modified to send television broadcasts to troops in Vietnam
VC-121J
4 C-121J converted for VIP use. One served with the Blue Angels.
EC-121K
Redesignated Navy WV-2 Warning Star
JC-121K
One EC-121K used as an avionics testbed
NC-121K
EC-121K used by the Navy
EC-121L
Redesignated Navy WV-2E
EC-121M
Redesignated Navy WV-2Q
WQC-121N
Redesignated Navy WV-3
EC-121P
EC-121K equipped for anti-submarine warfare
EC-121Q
EC-121D with upgraded electronics
EC-121R "BatCat"
EC-121K and EC-121P equipped to process signals from seismic instruments
NC-121S
Electronic warfare and reconnaissance version
EC-121T
Upgraded radar; One example is on display at Peterson Air and Space Museum, EC-121T photo.

R7O-1
The original US Navy designation of the R7V-1 based on L-1049D, R-3350-91 engines with 3,250 hp (2,425 kW) each
R7V-1
Re-designation of the R7O-1. Later redesignated C-121J
R7V-1P
One R7V-1 modified for Arctic use
R7V-2
Four prototypes with Pratt & Whitney YT34-P-12A turboprops of 4,140 shp (3,088 kW) each. Two were delivered as YC-121F prototype aircraft (see above).
PO-1W
Two maritime patrol aircraft equipped with search radar based on L-749, later re-designated WV-1.
PO-2W Warning Star
Long-range airborne radar aircraft, R-3350-34 or R-3350-42 engines with 3,400 hp (2,536 kW) each, based on L-1049, later re-designated WV-2.
WV-1
Re-designation of the PO-1W.
WV-2 Warning Star
Re-designation of the PO-2W. Later re-designated EC-121K.
WV-2E
Experimental version of WV-2 modified to carry a rotating radar dome similar to that of the Boeing E-3 Sentry. Later redesignated EC-121L.
WV-2Q
WV-2 equipped for electronic warfare, later redesignated EC-121M.
WV-3
Eight aircraft equipped for weather reconnaissance. Later re-designated WQC-121N.
XW2V-1
The XW2V-1 was a planned radar version of the WV-2 with the Starliner's wings for the US Navy. It would have included four Allison T56-A8 engines and missiles for protection against attackers. Considerably different from its predecessors, given the production designation Lockheed L-084.

Sources
C-69/C-121 - US Warplanes.net
Breffort, Dominique. Lockheed Constellation: from Excalibur to Starliner Civilian and Military Variants. Paris: Histoire and Collections, 2006. Print. 

Lockheed Constellation
Variants